The Barran Baronetcy, of Chapel Allerton Hall in Chapel Allerton in the West Riding of the County of York and Queen's Gate, St Mary's Abbot, in Kensington in the County of London, is a title in the Baronetage of the United Kingdom. It was created on 11 February 1895 for the merchant and Liberal politician John Barran. He represented Leeds and Otley in the House of Commons. He was succeeded by his grandson, the second Baronet. He sat as Liberal Member of Parliament for Hawick and served as Parliamentary Private Secretary to Prime Minister H. H. Asquith.

Two other members of the Barran family have also gained distinction. Sir Rowland Barran (1858–1949), sixth and youngest son of the first Baronet, represented Leeds North in Parliament. Sir David Barran (1912–2002), third son of the second Baronet, was Managing Director and Chairman of Shell.

Barran baronets, of Chapel Allerton Hall and Queen's Gate (1895)
Sir John Barran, 1st Baronet (1821–1905)
Sir John Nicholson Barran, 2nd Baronet (1872–1952)
Sir John Leighton Barran, 3rd Baronet (1904–1974)
Sir John Napoleon Ruthven Barran, 4th Baronet (1934–2010)
Sir John Ruthven Barran, 5th Baronet (born 1971)

The heir apparent is John Robert Nicholson Barran (born 2008)

Currently, the baronetcy is listed as vacant on the Official Roll of the Baronetage as the 5th Baronet has not yet proved his succession.

References

Kidd, Charles, Williamson, David (editors). Debrett's Peerage and Baronetage (1990 edition). New York: St Martin's Press, 1990.

Barran